Denmark station is a train station in Denmark, South Carolina, served by Amtrak, the United States' railroad passenger system. It was originally used by the Seaboard Air Line Railroad and the Southern Railway. Amtrak initiated service to the community on October 29, 1978, via the Champion (New York–St. Petersburg). According to Amtrak NEWS, the company's employee newsletter, Denmark was added to the schedule because there were no stop between Columbia, South Carolina, and Savannah, Georgia, although Denmark and the surrounding area had no sizable population.

References

External links

Denmark Amtrak Station (USA Rail Guide -- Train Web)
Denmark, South Carolina Railroad Stations (South Carolina Railroad Stations)

Amtrak stations in South Carolina
Seaboard Air Line Railroad stations
Stations along Southern Railway lines in the United States